Robel Bernárdez Martínez (born 8 June 1972) is a retired Honduran international football midfielder.

Club career
Bernárdez has only played for clubs in his native Honduras, starting with Platense and finishing his career at Atlético Olanchano. In between he played for local giants F.C. Motagua and Marathón as well as for Universidad.

International career
He made his debut for Honduras in a May 1994 Miami Cup match against El Salvador and has earned a total of 31 caps, scoring no goals. He has represented his country in 5 FIFA World Cup qualification matches and played at the 1999 UNCAF Nations Cup as well as at the 1998 CONCACAF Gold Cup and the 2001 Copa América.

His final international was a May 2002 friendly match against Japan.

References

External links

 LOS NEGROS recibimos demasiadas ofensas - La Tribuna 

1972 births
Living people
People from Colón Department (Honduras)
Association football midfielders
Honduran footballers
Honduras international footballers
1998 CONCACAF Gold Cup players
2001 Copa América players
Platense F.C. players
F.C. Motagua players
C.D. Marathón players
Liga Nacional de Fútbol Profesional de Honduras players